For the 1972 Vuelta a España, the field consisted of 100 riders; 57 finished the race.

By rider

By nationality

References

1972 Vuelta a España
1972